Vernashen is a village in the Yeghegnadzor Municipality of the Vayots Dzor Province in Armenia. The 13th-century fortress of Proshaberd (also known as Boloraberd) and the Spitakavor Monastery of 1321 are located near Vernashen.

Toponymy 
The village was previously known as Bashkend.

Gallery

References

External links 

Populated places in Vayots Dzor Province